is a Japanese cyclist, who currently rides for UCI Continental team .

Major results
2016
 National Under-23 Road Championships
1st  Road race
1st  Time trial
2017
 5th Time trial, National Road Championships
2019
 8th Overall Tour of Japan
2021
 7th Overall Tour of Japan
 7th Oita Urban Classic
2022
 3rd Overall Tour de Kumano
 5th Overall Tour of Japan
 1st Mountains classification

References

External links

1994 births
Living people
Japanese male cyclists
Japanese people of Spanish descent